Robert Laramée is a Canadian politician and was a city councillor in Montreal, Quebec.

Background 
Laramée holds a Bachelor’s degree in Recreation.  According to Fugues magazine, he is openly gay.

City Councillor 
Laramée successfully ran as Vision Montreal candidate to the City Council in the district of Père-Marquette in 1994 with 52% of the votes.  In 1997 he left Vision Montreal to sit as an Independent, as several of his colleagues did.  He ran as a candidate of Jacques Duchesneau's Nouveau Montréal in 1998, but lost against Vision Montreal candidate Jean-François Plante with only 33% of the vote.

He was re-elected in the district of Saint-Jacques in 2001 as a Vision Montreal, candidate with 48% of the vote, against incumbent and former colleague Sammy Forcillo (44%).

Borough mayoral candidate 
In 2005, Laramée tried to get elected Borough Mayor for Ville-Marie.  He lost with 35% of the vote against Benoît Labonté (40%).

Retirement from political office 
Laramée has been Vision Montréal Executive Director since 2006.

References

See also 
 Vision Montreal Crisis, 1997

Gay politicians
LGBT municipal councillors in Canada
Living people
Montreal city councillors
Year of birth missing (living people)
Canadian gay men
20th-century Canadian politicians
20th-century Canadian LGBT people
21st-century Canadian politicians
21st-century Canadian LGBT people